Soem Klang is a village and tambon (subdistrict) of Soem Ngam District, in Lampang Province, Thailand. In 2005 it had a total population of 8400 people. The tambon contains 9  villages.

References

Tambon of Lampang province
Populated places in Lampang province